Mpozo is a town in the Bas-Congo province of the Democratic Republic of the Congo near the border with Angola.

Transport 

The town is served by a railway station on the national network.

See also 

 Railway stations in DRCongo

References 

Populated places in Kongo Central